Maulana Atta Ur Rehman ((), born 25 July 1965) currently he is serving as Senator. He is also served as federal Minister of Tourism from 2008-2010 during PPP government. Currently he is Vice President JUI (F), Khyber Pakhtunkhwa. He is the brother of Maulana Fazl-ur-Rehman, the Emir of JUI (F) Pakistan and the second son of former Chief Minister of Khyber Pakhtunkhwa the then NWFP Maulana Mufti Mahmud. Mufti Mahmud was a political leader of the Jamiat-Ulema-e-Hind before 1947 in British India and JUI after Pakistan came into being.

Political career
He was elected two times consecutively as the member of national assembly of Pakistan from NA-25, District Tank. In his first election he led the main contender Mr Dawar Khan Kundi by about 72,000 votes. In his second election of 2008, he defeated the former provincial minister Habib Ullah Khan Kundi aka Babu Khan, but there was a controversy in the result and Babu Khan claimed that the election was unfair and he petitioned a case in the Supreme Court of Pakistan against Maulana Atta ur Rehman but the Supreme Court cleared the result and Maulana Atta ur Rehman was declared as the member of National Assembly of Pakistan. At that time, JUI under a unanimous decision passed by the central executive committee joined the PPP government as a coalition partner and he was given the portfolio of Minister of Tourism.

References

1965 births
Living people
Jamiat Ulema-e-Islam (F) politicians
People from Dera Ismail Khan District
Pakistani senators (14th Parliament)
Gomal University alumni